The 1974 Giro di Lombardia was the 68th edition of the Giro di Lombardia cycle race and was held on 12 October 1974. The race started in Milan and finished in Como. The race was won by Roger De Vlaeminck of the Brooklyn team.

General classification

References

1974
Giro di Lombardia
Giro di Lombardia
1974 Super Prestige Pernod